The 1935 Penn State Nittany Lions men's soccer team represented Pennsylvania State University during the 1935 season playing in the Eastern Intercollegiate Soccer League. It was the program's 25th season fielding a men's varsity soccer team. The 1935 season is William Jeffrey's tenth year at the helm.

Background 

The 1935 season was the Nittany Lions' 25th season as a varsity soccer program, and their 10th season playing as a part of the Intercollegiate Soccer Football Association. The team was led by 10th year head coach, William Jeffrey, who had previously served as the head coach for the semi-professional soccer team, Altoona Works.

The Nittany Lions finished their season undefeated and unscored on through seven games. Penn State extended their unbeaten streak that began during the 1932 season to 21 matches. Penn State was invited at the end of its season to face west coast soccer champions San Francisco University for a National Intercollegiate Association Football Championship title game. The team did not make the trip to California due to budgetary issues.

The Nittany Lions were denied the Eastern Intercollegiate Soccer Football Association title due to the team not playing four active members of the ISFA, the team instead received an honorable mention by the association. Penn State's schedule originally featured four active members but Syracuse was later suspended for the 1935 season due to only playing 3 league contests in 1934. The team instead received an honorable mention by the association. As a fix to future scheduling issues the association removed its four active member game mandate and instead would choose a champion based on strength of schedule. This change also made every school actively participating in the association into an active member.

Squad

Roster

Schedule 

|-
!colspan=8 style=""| Regular season
|-

References

External links

1935
Penn State Nittany Lions
Penn State Nittany Lions men's soccer